A dynasty is a sequence of rulers from the same family, usually in the context of a monarchical system, but sometimes also appearing in republics. A dynasty may also be referred to as a "house", "family" or "clan", among others. 

Historians periodize the histories of many states and civilizations, such as Ancient Iran (3200 – 539 BC), Ancient Egypt (3100 – 30 BC), Ancient and Imperial China (2070 BC – AD 1912) and Chola Dynasty (300 BC – AD 1279), using a framework of successive dynasties. As such, the term "dynasty" may be used to delimit the era during which a family reigned. 

Before the 18th century, most dynasties throughout the world have traditionally been reckoned patrilineally, such as those that follow the Frankish Salic law. In polities where it was permitted, succession through a daughter usually established a new dynasty in her husband's family name. This has changed in all of Europe's remaining monarchies, where succession law and conventions have maintained dynastic names de jure through a female. 

Dynastic politics has declined over time, owing to a decline in monarchy as a form of government, a rise in democracy, and a reduction within democracies of elected members from dynastic families.

Etymology
The word dynasty derives from Latin , which comes from Ancient Greek , meaning 'power', 'dominion', and 'rule'.

Terminology
The word "dynasty" is sometimes used informally for people who are not rulers but are, for example, members of a family with influence and power in other areas, such as a series of successive owners of a major company. It is also extended to unrelated people, such as major poets of the same school or various rosters of a single sports team.

The dynastic family or lineage may be known as a "noble house", which may be styled as "imperial", "royal", "princely", "ducal", "comital" or "baronial", depending upon the chief or present title borne by its members.

Dynast
A ruler from a dynasty is sometimes referred to as a "dynast", but this term is also used to describe any member of a reigning family who retains a right to succeed to a throne. For example, King Edward VIII ceased to be a dynast of the House of Windsor following his abdication.

In historical and monarchist references to formerly reigning families, a "dynast" is a family member who would have had succession rights, were the monarchy's rules still in force. For example, after the 1914 assassinations of Archduke Franz Ferdinand of Austria and his morganatic wife, their son Maximilian, Duke of Hohenberg, was bypassed for the Austro-Hungarian throne because he was not a Habsburg dynast. Even after the abolition of the Austrian monarchy, Duke Maximilian and his descendants have not been considered the rightful pretenders by Austrian monarchists, nor have they claimed that position.

The term "dynast" is sometimes used only to refer to agnatic descendants of a realm's monarchs, and sometimes to include those who hold succession rights through cognatic royal descent. The term can therefore describe overlapping but distinct sets of people. For example, David Armstrong-Jones, 2nd Earl of Snowdon, a nephew of Queen Elizabeth II, is in the line of succession to the British crown, making him a British dynast. On the other hand, since he is not a patrilineal member of the British royal family, he is therefore not a dynast of the House of Windsor.

Comparatively, the German aristocrat Prince Ernst August of Hanover, a male-line descendant of King George III, possesses no legal British name, titles or styles (although he is entitled to reclaim the former royal dukedom of Cumberland). He was born in the line of succession to the British throne and was bound by Britain's Royal Marriages Act 1772 until it was repealed when the Succession to the Crown Act 2013 took effect on 26 March 2015. Thus, he requested and obtained formal permission from Queen Elizabeth II to marry the Roman Catholic Princess Caroline of Monaco in 1999. Yet, a clause of the English Act of Settlement 1701 remained in effect at that time, stipulating that dynasts who marry Roman Catholics are considered "dead" for the purpose of succession to the British throne. That exclusion, too, ceased to apply on 26 March 2015, with retroactive effect for those who had been dynasts before triggering it by marriage to a Roman Catholic.

Dynastic marriage
A "dynastic marriage" is one that complies with monarchical house law restrictions, so that the descendants are eligible to inherit the throne or other royal privileges. For example, the marriage of King Willem-Alexander of the Netherlands to Máxima Zorreguieta in 2002 was dynastic, making their eldest child, Princess Catharina-Amalia, the heir apparent to the Crown of the Netherlands. The marriage of his younger brother, Prince Friso of Orange-Nassau, in 2003 lacked government support and parliamentary approval. Thus, Prince Friso forfeited his place in the order of succession to the Dutch throne, and consequently lost his title as a "Prince of the Netherlands", and left his children without dynastic rights.

History
Historians periodize the histories of many states and civilizations, such as Ancient Iran (3200 – 539 BC), Ancient Egypt (3100 – 30 BC) and Ancient and Imperial China (2070 BC – AD 1912), using a framework of successive dynasties. As such, the term "dynasty" may be used to delimit the era during which a family reigned, and also to describe events, trends and artifacts of that period (e.g., "a Ming dynasty vase"). Until the 19th century, it was taken for granted that a legitimate function of a monarch was to aggrandize his dynasty: that is, to expand the wealth and power of his family members.

Before the 18th century, most dynasties throughout the world have traditionally been reckoned patrilineally, such as those that follow the Frankish Salic law. In polities where it was permitted, succession through a daughter usually established a new dynasty in her husband's family name. This has changed in all of Europe's remaining monarchies, where succession law and conventions have maintained dynastic names de jure through a female. For instance, the House of Windsor will be maintained through the children of Queen Elizabeth II, as it did with the monarchy of the Netherlands, whose dynasty remained the House of Orange-Nassau through three successive queens regnant. The earliest such example among major European monarchies was in the Russian Empire in the 18th century, where the name of the House of Romanov was maintained through Grand Duchess Anna Petrovna. This also happened in the case of Queen Maria II of Portugal, who married Prince Ferdinand of Saxe-Coburg and Gotha-Koháry, but whose descendants remained members of the House of Braganza, per Portuguese law; in fact, since the 1800s, the only female monarch in Europe who had children belonging to a different house was Queen Victoria and that was due to disagreements over how to choose a non German house. In Limpopo Province of South Africa, Balobedu determined descent matrilineally, while rulers have at other times adopted the name of their mother's dynasty when coming into her inheritance. Less frequently, a monarchy has alternated or been rotated, in a multi-dynastic (or polydynastic) system—that is, the most senior living members of parallel dynasties, at any point in time, constitute the line of succession.

Longevity
Dynasties lasting at least 250 years include the following. Legendary lineages that cannot be historically confirmed are not included.

Extant sovereign dynasties

There are 43 sovereign states with a monarch as head of state, of which 41 are ruled by dynasties. There are currently 26 sovereign dynasties.

Political families

Though in elected governments, rule does not pass automatically by inheritance, political power often accrues to generations of related individuals in the elected positions of republics, and constitutional monarchies. Eminence, influence, tradition, genetics, and nepotism may contribute to the phenomenon.

Family dictatorships are a different concept in which political power passes within a family because of the overwhelming authority of the leader, rather than informal power accrued to the family.

Influential wealthy families

Gallery

See also

 Cadet branch
 Commonwealth realm
 Conquest dynasty
 Dynastic cycle
 Dynastic order
 Dynastic union
 Elective monarchy
 Family seat
 Heads of former ruling families
 Hereditary monarchy
 Iranian Intermezzo
 List of current constituent monarchs
 List of current monarchies
 List of current monarchs of sovereign states
 List of dynasties
 List of empires
 List of family trees
 List of kingdoms and royal dynasties
 List of largest empires
 List of monarchies
 List of noble houses
 Non-sovereign monarchy
 Realm
 Royal family
 Royal household
 Royal intermarriage
 Self-proclaimed monarchy

Notes

References

Monarchy
 
History-related lists